Ricardo Andrade Alves (born January 12, 1982, in Guarulhos, Brazil), better known simply as Ricardinho is a Brazilian footballer.

Teams
  Ituano 2002
  União Barbarense 2003
  SFC Opava 2004
  Guarani 2005
  Mogi Mirim 2006
  Juventus 2007
  Santa Cruz 2008
  San Martín de Porres 2008
  Audax Italiano 2009

External links
 Profile at BDFA

1982 births
Living people
People from Guarulhos
Brazilian footballers
Brazilian expatriate footballers
Ituano FC players
União Agrícola Barbarense Futebol Clube players
Guarani FC players
Mogi Mirim Esporte Clube players
Clube Atlético Juventus players
Santa Cruz Futebol Clube players
Audax Italiano footballers
Chilean Primera División players
Expatriate footballers in Chile
Expatriate footballers in Peru
Expatriate footballers in the Czech Republic
Association football forwards
Footballers from São Paulo (state)